A power supply is an electronic device that supplies electric energy to an electrical load.

Power supply may also refer to:

 Power supply unit (computer) a computer component
 Electricity delivery to households and industry via electric power generation and distribution networks
 Power Supply (album), a 1980 album of Budgie
 Power Supply (EP), a 2006 album of Anamanaguchi